The football tournament at the 1989 Southeast Asian Games was held from 21 to 31 August 1989 in Kuala Lumpur, Malaysia.

Teams

Tournament 
All times are Malaysia Standard Time (MST) – UTC+8

Group stage

Group A

Group B

Knockout stage

Semi-finals

Bronze medal match

Gold medal match

Winners

Medal winners

Notes

References 

Veroeveren, Piet. Southeast Asian Games 1989. RSSSF.
SEA Games 1989. AFF official website

Southeast
1989 in Malaysian football
Football at the Southeast Asian Games
1989 Southeast Asian Games
1989